This is a list of films produced by the Tollywood film industry based in Hyderabad in the 1940s:

1940s
Telugu
Telugu films

te:తెలుగు సినిమాలు